Tolú is a small town and municipality in Sucre Department, northern Colombia.

Tolu may also refer to:

Places
Tolu, Kentucky, an unincorporated community and census-designated place in Crittenden County
Tolu Site, a prehistoric archeological site near the above community

People
Tolu Ajayi
Tolu Fahamokioa

Other
Tolu balsam, a recent (non-fossil) resin that originates from South America
Myroxylon or tolu, a tree in Central and South America
Tolumnia (plant), an orchid genus abbreviated Tolu

See also

Tola (disambiguation)
Toloo, an Iranian newspaper